The Squaw Ridge lava field, also known as the East Lava Field, is a young basaltic field located in the U.S. state of Oregon southeast of Newberry Volcano. The flow erupted from the Lava Mountain shield and is likely related to the Four Craters Lava Field, both of which were created after Mount Mazama erupted.

Notable Vents

See also
 List of volcanoes in the United States
 Types of volcanic eruptions

References

Volcanic fields of Oregon
Landforms of Lake County, Oregon
Lava fields